The Christina River is a tributary of the Delaware River, approximately 35 miles (56 km) long, in northern Delaware. It also flows through small areas of southeastern Pennsylvania and northeastern Maryland.   Near its mouth, the river flows past downtown Wilmington, Delaware, forming the city's harbor for traffic on the Delaware River.  The Port of Wilmington, opened in 1923 at the river's mouth, handles international cargo and trade.

The river rises in southeastern Pennsylvania in Franklin Township in southern Chester County, and initially flows southeastwardly, passing through the northeastern extremity of Maryland in northeastern Cecil County, into New Castle County in Delaware, where it flows through western and southern areas of the city of Newark and then turns northeastwardly, passing the town of Newport and approaching Wilmington from the southwest.  It receives White Clay Creek from the west near Newport, and Brandywine Creek in Wilmington, approximately 2 miles (3 km) upstream of its mouth.

Brandywine Creek, despite being a tributary of the Christina, drains 58% of this area. White Clay Creek and its tributary, Red Clay Creek, drain a further 28% of the basin. Including Brandywine Creek, 71% of the Christina's basin is in Pennsylvania; 28% is in Delaware; and 1% is in Maryland. The basin's streams supply approximately 100 million gallons (400 million liters) of water per day for more than half a million people in the three states, providing 75% of the water supply for New Castle County, Delaware, and more than 40% of the water supply for Chester County, Pennsylvania.

The river was named for Queen Christina of Sweden.  Fort Christina, the first permanent European settlement in Delaware, was established at the confluence of Brandywine Creek and the Christina River in 1638 as a part of the Swedish colony of New Sweden.  The fort was captured by the Dutch in 1655, and by the English in 1664.

Many rowing teams and clubs in Wilmington practice along the Christina River, among them the Wilmington Youth Rowing Association, Wilmington rowing association, Newport Rowing Club, and University of Delaware. In addition, there is a fall "head race" occurring on the river by the name of the Head of the Christina held every year in the boat house of Wilmington youth rowing association.

Just south of downtown Wilmington, the Christina provides home port to the "Kalmar Nyckel", Delaware's official Tall Ship. Co-located with the Kalmar Nyckel is the home port to the U.S. Coast Guard Auxiliary's Search and Rescue Detachment (SARDET) Wilmington.

The Christina River is also one of many Striped Bass spawning areas that empty into the Delaware River.

The Christina Riverwalk makes up a segment of the East Coast Greenway, a 3,000 mile long system of trails connecting Maine to Florida.

Variant names and spellings
According to the Geographic Names Information System, the Christina River has also been known historically as:

See also

 List of Delaware rivers
 List of Maryland rivers
 List of Pennsylvania rivers
 White Clay Creek

References

Tributaries of the Delaware River
Rivers of Delaware
Rivers of Maryland
Rivers of Pennsylvania
Rivers of Cecil County, Maryland
Wilmington, Delaware
Wilmington Riverfront
Rivers of New Castle County, Delaware
Rivers of Chester County, Pennsylvania